The 1920 NYU Violets football team was an American football team that represented New York University as an independent during the 1920 college football season. In their first year under head coach Frank Gargan, the team compiled a 2–5–1 record.

Schedule

References

NYU
NYU Violets football seasons
NYU Violets football